Villa Volpi is a neoclassical seaside villa situated in Sabaudia, Italy.

History 
The villa was commissioned in 1952 by Countess Nathalie Volpi of Misrata, wife of Count Giuseppe Volpi, founder of the Venice Film Festival, and was designed by architect .

The villa has served as the filming location for several films including Divorce Italian Style and Compagni di scuola.

Description 
The villa, which is located within the boundaries of Circeo National Park, lies on a sand dune facing the Tyrrhenian Sea. Featuring a neoclassical and neo-Palladian style, it is composed by a central volume and two side wings. The central part of the villa resembles a classical Roman temple.

Gallery

References

External links

Sabaudia
Buildings and structures in the Province of Latina
Villas in Lazio